Edelsfeld is a municipality in the district of Amberg-Sulzbach in Bavaria, Germany.

References

Amberg-Sulzbach